Mexicana Universal Michoacán is a pageant in Michoacán, Mexico, that selects that state's representative for the national Mexicana Universal pageant.

En 2000 y 2001 no fue enviada una representante del estado.

The State Organization hasn't had a national winner in Nuestra Belleza México, obteniendo sin embargo la corona de Reina Hispanoamerican Mexico en el 2016 con Magdalena Chipres, se posiciono como virreina en el certamen internacional.

Michoacán actualmente cuenta con 7 clasificaciones a las finales nacionales. Dos al top 20, 2003 y 2019. Una al top 15, 2010 y con cuatro pases al top 10, 2004, 2006, 2016, 2018.

Titleholders
Below are the names of the annual titleholders of Mexicana Universal Michoacán, listed in ascending order, and their final placements in the Mexicana Universal after their participation, until 2017 the names are as Nuestra Belleza Michoacán.

 Competed in Miss Universe.
 Competed in Miss International.
 Competed in Miss Charm International.
 Competed in Miss Continente Americano.
 Competed in Reina Hispanoamericana.
 Competed in Miss Orb International.
 Competed in Nuestra Latinoamericana Universal.

External links
Official Website

Nuestra Belleza México